Chir or Chiyar may refer to:
 Chir, Bavanat, Fars Province
 Chir, Mamasani, Fars Province
 Chir, Kohgiluyeh and Boyer-Ahmad
 Chir, West Azerbaijan
 Chir, Urmia, West Azerbaijan Province
 Chiyar, Zanjan
 Chir, alternate name of Chavor, Zanjan Province